Aboubacar Doumbia may refer to:

 Abou Nidal, singer of Ivory Coast, also known as Aboubacar Doumbia
 Aboubacar Doumbia (footballer, born 1995), Malian football midfielder
 Aboubacar Doumbia (footballer, born 1999), Malian football forward